Ihor Levchenko (born 23 February 1991) is a Ukrainian professional footballer who plays as a goalkeeper for Westfalia Leer.

Career
Levchenko left IFK Mariehamn at the end of 2018.
Levchenko signed for AFC Eskilstuna in March, 2019. 
Released from his contract in December 2019, Levchenko signed for Dinamo Batumi in January 2020.

Honours 
2009 UEFA European Under-19 Football Championship: Champion

References

External links
 
 

1991 births
Living people
Ukrainian footballers
Ukrainian expatriate footballers
Ukraine youth international footballers
Footballers from Donetsk
Association football goalkeepers
FC Olimpik Donetsk players
FC Zorya Luhansk players
FC Mariupol players
IFK Mariehamn players
AFC Eskilstuna players
FC Dinamo Batumi players
FC Metalurh Zaporizhzhia players
Veikkausliiga players
Ukrainian Premier League players
Allsvenskan players
Erovnuli Liga players
Expatriate footballers in Finland
Expatriate footballers in Sweden
Expatriate footballers in Georgia (country)
Ukrainian expatriate sportspeople in Finland
Ukrainian expatriate sportspeople in Sweden
Ukrainian expatriate sportspeople in Georgia (country)